"Putin – khuylo!" (commonly translated as "Putin [is a] dickhead") is a slogan deriding Russian President Vladimir Putin. 

It originated in Ukraine in 2014, having grown from a football chant first performed by FC Metalist Kharkiv ultras and Shakhtar Donetsk ultras in March 2014 at the onset of the Russo-Ukrainian War. The phrase has become a protest song and is widely spread in Ukraine amongst supporters of Ukrainian sovereignty and territorial integrity, as well as those opposing Vladimir Putin in both Russia and Ukraine.

Etymology

The obscene term (mat)  is variously transliterated as huilo, huylo, khuilo, khuylo, or chujlo. Combined with the suffix -lo, it is a personal insult. It can be translated as "dickhead", but its connotation is far more pejorative in those languages than in English. The word is identical in Russian, Ukrainian, and Belarusian.

In May 2014, media outlets reported that the Russian profanity khuilo had been added to the Urban Dictionary as a synonym for Vladimir Putin.

Another abbreviation containing a similarly suggestive meaning is "" (PTN PNKh), which stands for "" in Ukrainian (Putin, pishov na khuy), or, alternatively, "" in Russian (Putin, poshol na khuy) which is similar to "Putin, go fuck yourself" and could be rendered in English as "PTN GFY".

Origin
The chant has its origins in "Surkis Khuylo!", a football chant initiated by the ultras of FC Metalist Kharkiv some time in 2010, during the height of a feud between two Ukrainian oligarchs, Oleksandr Yaroslavsky, then owner of "Metalist", and Hryhoriy Surkis, then president of the Football Federation of Ukraine who had strong historic and family ties with FC Dynamo Kyiv. The Kharkiv fans, who sided with their club president, chanted "Surkis Khuylo!" to express their dislike of the Football Federation president in vulgar and profane form.

The first recorded public performance of the "Putin khuylo!" chant and the song that grew from it took place in March 2014 in Kharkiv, when the local fans chanted it during their street march. The recording was soon posted to YouTube. Various groups of Ukrainian ultras of major Ukrainian clubs with the exception of FC Sevastopol have historically held strong pro-Ukrainian political views. These football fans sided with Ukraine at the onset of the Russian annexation of Crimea and military intervention, as well as during the pro-Russian unrest in the east and south of Ukraine, when the city of Kharkiv was in turmoil. 

Soon, the song that vulgarly derided Putin gained wider popularity, spreading amongst other clubs, such as the fans of Shakhtar Donetsk (Donetsk) and Dynamo Kyiv (Kyiv), who were formerly feuding but sang the song together. During the 2014 Russian intervention and partial occupation of Ukraine, the ultras of various Ukrainian clubs set aside their rivalries and chanted the song in joint street marches. The chant became "a nationwide cultural meme" according to The Guardian. 

Alexander J. Motyl reported, "A shorthand, more modest version of the lyrics has even entered the popular discourse. If you want to express your views of Putin, all you need do is say 'la-la la-la la-la', and everything's quite clear," which is a reference to the refrain of the chant.

Artemy Troitsky identified the melody of the chant as coming from the song "Speedy Gonzales", popularised by American singer Pat Boone in 1962.

In June 2015, the Russian Federal Security Service started a criminal prosecution and investigation of activist Daria Poludova for using the song on VK.

When Russian television channel TNT aired one episode of the Ukrainian sitcom Servant of the People in December 2019, a scene containing a joke that referenced the song, in which the fictional president played by Volodymyr Zelenskyy asked "Putin khublo?" when told that Putin wore a Hublot watch, was cut out of the episode. The omission occurred only within central Russia and the Moscow region, but not in the eastern regions of Russia.

Use

In music
Several Ukrainian mainstream rock music bands included or adapted the chant into their music. A metal remix, released in April 2014 by AstrogentA, added instrumentation and reworked the video of the March 30 protest chant to depict its spread throughout Ukrainian football clubs. 

The Ukrainian band  received international attention following the May 6, 2014 release of a song and a video titled "Putin Hello!" Their song uses a double entendre, substituting the objectionable word "khuylo" with the English word "Hello!" Alluding to the "Putin Khuylo!" chant, the video features band players wearing Ukrainian football club colors and posing as ultras marching and chanting "Putin Hello" as the refrain of the song. The band members asserted, tongue-in-cheek, that the linking of their song to an offensive anti-Putin chant was a misunderstanding and insisted that the only people who found the chant objectionable were Russians unfamiliar with English.

Hromadske.TV aired a live performance of the song by Lemonchiki Project in May 2014. The rock band Druha Rika performed the song at their concert in June 2014. Other rock adaptations were made by Mad Heads and Haydamaky. The Kyiv Post reviewed nine video versions of the song and two other related songs.

In sport
In October 2014, Belarusians joined visiting Ukrainians in a performance of the chant by "nearly the entire stadium" at a UEFA Euro 2016 qualifying match in Barysaw, Belarus, resulting in more than 100 Ukrainian and 30 Belarusian football fans being detained and interrogated, reportedly on suspicion of using "obscene language". Seven, all Ukrainian, were sentenced to five days in jail for obscene language, whilst one was given a 10-day sentence for allegedly wearing a swastika.

In art 
In December 2022, a statue giving a visual interpretation of "Putin khuylo" was erected in the English town of Rowley Regis.

In the world press 
The phrase received attention in the world press and was the subject of publications in influential international newspapers, magazines and numerous online publications.

In the USA 

 The Washington Post.
 The Wall Street Journal.
 The Atlantic.
 Time.
 World Affairs. 
 Business Insider.
 Bloomberg View.
 International Business Times.
 Newsweek.
 Foreign Policy.

In politics

Oleh Lyashko
Oleh Lyashko, a former Ukrainian MP and leader of the country's Radical Party, performed the song in May 2014 at a public rally during his 2014 presidential campaign.

Andrii Deshchytsia

Hromadske.TV aired a footage showing Andrii Deshchytsia, a then Minister of Foreign Affairs of Ukraine, uttering the word "khuylo" in reference to the Russian President Putin during his plea with protesters in front of the Russian Embassy in Kyiv on the evening of June 14, 2014, following the shoot-down of a Ukrainian Air Force Ilyushin Il-76 by Russian-armed rebels. Deshchytsya pleaded the protesters to refrain from violence directed at the Embassy that would cause a bigger diplomatic scandal. Deshchytsia stated: "He (Putin) is a khuylo, but - disperse, please!".

Shortly afterward, Ukrainian President Petro Poroshenko nominated a different diplomat to lead the Foreign Affairs ministry. According to the Ukrainian media, the presidential plan to replace the minister was known prior to the incident, being proposed as part of a bigger reshuffle in the Ukrainian government. Soon after, Poroshenko praised the work of Deshchytsia, who was then leaving his ministerial position, and the parliament gave the outgoing minister a standing ovation.

Deshchytsia's use of the wording caused widespread discontent amongst the Russian leadership. However, Geoffrey Pyatt, the US ambassador to Ukraine, wrote on Twitter that minister Deshchytsia's use of the chant had been "seeking to defuse a dangerous situation", calling Deshchytsia "a skilled diplomat and credit to Ukraine."

Arsen Avakov
In July 2014, Arsen Avakov who was the Ukrainian Minister of Internal Affairs, one of the country's major security agencies, published a Facebook post with a photo he took that showed a bus stop near Sloviansk covered by a "Putin Khuilo!" graffiti.  The minister's post included his comment with the picture saying: "A private opinion some place near Slovyansk. Aligning myself." 

A week later, on July 9, Avakov met the troops of the Kyiv-1 Special Police force battalion. After the traditional drill exchange of the "Glory to Ukraine!" greeting followed by the customary "To Heroes, Glory!" response, Avakov exclaimed "Putin!" to which the troops responded "khuylo!" The minister was clearly happy with the response and gave a "Vol'no!" ("at ease!") drill command.

2022 Russian invasion of Ukraine 
The phrase became popular again during the 2022 Russian invasion of Ukraine. Ukrainian brewer Yuri Zastavny began preparing glass bottles to be used for anti-Russian Molotov cocktails with the English-lettered label "Putin Huylo".

Ukrainian hackers disabled electric vehicle charging stations in Russia so that instead of providing a charge, the stations display a scrolling message that includes the phrase.

Gallery

See also 
 O1G, a similar slogan targeting Viktor Orbán
 Russian warship, go fuck yourself
 Putler
 Grandpa in his bunker

Notes

Further reading 
 Christian Diemer. Mutterlandpop. Lokale Markierung und Entgrenzung musikalischer. Darbietungen auf ukrainischen Feiertagen // Speaking in Tongues: Pop lokal global / Dietrich Helms, Thomas Phleps. — Transcript Verlag, 2015. — PP. 78–80. — 219 p. — (Beiträge zur Popularmusikforschung, Vol. 42). — . — .
 Frédéric Döhl, Klaus Nathaus. Annäherungen an einen flüchtigen Gegenstand. Neue Literatur zur Geschichte der Musik aus Journalistik, Historiographie und Musikwissenschaft // Neue Politische Literatur. — 2017. — Bd. 62, Nr. 3. — S. 491.
 Taras Kuzio. Ukraine: Democratization, Corruption, and the New Russian Imperialism: Democratization, Corruption, and the New Russian Imperialism. — ABC-CLIO, 2015. — С. 112. — 641 с. — (Praeger Security International). — . — .
 Oksana Havryliv. Verbale Aggression: das Spektrum der Funktionen // Linguistik Online. — 2017. — 25 Aprils (Bd. 82, H. 3). — S. 27–47. — ISSN 1615-3014. — DOI:10.13092/lo.82.3713.

References

External links

Russo-Ukrainian War
Political slurs for people
Football songs and chants
Ukrainian songs
2014 songs
Cultural depictions of Vladimir Putin
2014 in Ukraine
Opposition to Vladimir Putin
Russian profanity
Articles containing video clips
Ukrainian phrases
Russian political phrases
Protest songs
Works about Vladimir Putin
Songs about presidents
2014 neologisms